Annie Verona "Veronica" Barry Hughart (1907–1977) was artist, architectural designer and journalist who lived in Tucson, Arizona and was an active part of the Old Fort Lowell art colony.

Life

Hughart was born in Idaho to Ernest Zimmerman Barry and Annie Lee Frazelle. She attended school in North Carolina and lived in Illinois and Connecticut. In 1931, she married John Harding Page. She moved to a ranch near Willcox, Arizona in 1943.  She purchased and operated the H Cross guest ranch near Bonita before moving to Tucson in 1951.

In 1954, Hughart purchased a three-room adobe shell on Fort Lowell Road.  With the help of her twin sons Peter and author Barry Hughart she transformed the structure into what was called in the Arizona Daily Star in 1957 “a small house of unusual charm, conveniently compact while suggesting spaciousness. One principle appears to guide everything she does; every situation is unique.  In her architectural work, she constantly adapts traditional ideas to meet a particular need; she is a past master of making what she needs from what she has at hand.” The Japanese inspired garden of her Fort Lowell home was designed by Tucson modernist sculptor and artist Charles Clement.

Hughart was an unabashed enthusiast about Arizona-Sonoran indigenous architecture and building materials. In the early 1950s, she wrote a nationally syndicated newspaper column called "What A Women Thinks".  She studied architecture and designed or remodeled more than thirty Tucson houses between 1956 and her death.  Hughart died in Tucson, Arizona in 1977.

Works 
 Veronica Hughart House (Old Fort Lowell, Tucson, Arizona)
 Germaine Cheruy and René Cheruy House Additions (Old Fort Lowell, Tucson, Arizona)
 S. Bayard Colgate House (Tucson, Arizona) 
 Josias Joesler 2nd House (W. H. Loerpabels Addition) (Poets Corner, Tucson, Arizona) 
 James F. Eager Speculative House (Flecha Caida Estates, Tucson, Arizona)
 Daniel Davis House (Tucson, Arizona) 
 John H. Hansen House (Tucson, Arizona) 1963 
 Nora Pickrell House, (Tucson, Arizona) 
 Barton Cross House, (Tucson, Arizona) 1969

References

Turner, Teresa, The People of Fort Lowell, Fort Lowell Historic District Board
Arizona Daily Star, Artist, Designer Veronica Hughart Dies of Cancer, 4 August 1977

External links
 Work in Old Fort Lowell

1907 births
20th-century American painters
American women painters
Artists from Tucson, Arizona
1977 deaths
20th-century American architects
Architects from Tucson, Arizona
20th-century American women artists